Jnanadhir Chandra Sarma Sarkar was an Indian jurist. He served as a judge of the Calcutta High Court.

Sarma Sarkar Commission 
The Sarma Sarkar commission headed by Justice (Retired) Janadhir Sharma Sarkar was formed in 1970 by the Government oF West Bengal for inquiring into charges of public servants trampling on democratic rights of citizens.

Works
Commission of Inquiry : Practise and Principles

References 

Year of birth missing (living people)
Living people
Indian jurists